John Frith (6 July 1837 – 17 February 1904) was a British trade unionist.

Born in Rawmarsh, Frith followed his father in becoming a coal miner, working as a trapper from the age of ten, and then working his way up to become a coal getter.  In 1858, he was a founding member of the South Yorkshire Miners' Association (SYMA), forming a lodge in Rawmarsh.  In 1873, he relocated to Roundwood, and the following year, he was elected as president of the union.  In 1875, the union's leader, John Normansell, died, and Frith took over as secretary.

When Frith became leader of the union, the price of coal was falling, leading to wage cuts.  The SYMA had invested in the Shirland Colliery Company, which collapsed in 1877, losing all the union's funds.  The union also lost its members in Derbyshire, who transferred to the new Derbyshire Miners' Association.  This succession of difficulties led Frith to arrange a merger between the SYMA and the West Yorkshire Miners' Association, forming the Yorkshire Miners' Association in 1881.  He became the new union's first financial secretary, serving until his death, in 1904.

Frith also served on Barnsley Town Council, as a Liberal-Labour member.

References

1837 births
1904 deaths
Councillors in South Yorkshire
English trade unionists
People from Rawmarsh